Fred Walton (born 1949) is an American film director and screenwriter. Among his films are When a Stranger Calls, April Fool's Day, The Rosary Murders, I Saw What You Did, When a Stranger Calls Back and The Stepford Husbands.

Born around 1950, Walton was raised in Chevy Chase, Maryland. He graduated from Denison University, where he majored in theater. As of 2016, Walton resided in Portland, Oregon, where he has lived since the 1990s.

Filmography

References

External links 

1949 births
Denison University alumni
Film directors from Maryland
Living people
Horror film directors